State Street Houses describes 23 Greek Revival and Italianate rowhouses built between 1847 and 1874 and located at 291-299 (odd) and 290-324 (even) State Street between Smith and Hoyt Streets in the Boerum Hill neighborhood of Brooklyn, New York City. The construction of the houses was part of the transformation of the formerly rural area into a fashionable new residential neighborhood.

The houses, which are three stories high on raised basements and feature the same cornice lines and similar window heights, were designated New York City landmarks in 1973, and are the contributing properties to a national historic district which was listed on the National Register of Historic Places in 1980.

References
Notes

External links

Greek Revival architecture in New York City
Greek Revival houses in New York (state)
Italianate architecture in New York (state)
Boerum Hill
Historic districts on the National Register of Historic Places in Brooklyn